The 2006–07 season was Nottingham Forest's 2nd consecutive season in the League One.

Team kit

|

|

|

Pre-season and friendlies

Results

League One

Results

League table

FA Cup

Results

League Cup

Results

Johnstone's Paint Trophy

Results

Squad statistics

Appearances and Goals

|-
|}

Top scorers
Includes all competitive matches. The list is sorted by league goals when total goals are equal.

Transfers

In

Out

Loan In

Loan Out

References

Nottingham Forest F.C. seasons
Nottingham Forest